Blue Ridge High School is a high school in Farmer City, Illinois. It has 228 students, 21 faculty members, and 5 support staff.   The school is operated by Blue Ridge Community Unit School District 18 and serves the Farmer City, Mansfield, and Bellflower communities.  The principal is John Lawrence.

Athletics
Blue Ridge High School athletics participate in the Lincoln Prairie Conference and are members of the Illinois High School Association.

Boys
Baseball
Basketball
Football
Golf
Soccer
Track & Field

Girls
Basketball
Golf
Softball
Track & Field
Volleyball

References

External links

District site

Public high schools in Illinois
Schools in DeWitt County, Illinois